Rämismühle-Zell railway station is a railway station in the Swiss canton of Zurich. The station is situated in the municipality of Zell. It is located on the Tösstalbahn between Winterthur and Rapperswil, and is served by Zurich S-Bahn lines S26 and since December 2020, S11.

References 

Railway stations in the canton of Zürich
Swiss Federal Railways stations